Cymbopteryx diffusa is a moth in the family Crambidae. It was described by Eugene G. Munroe in 1974. It is found in Chiapas, Mexico.

References

Moths described in 1974
Odontiini